Chikelue Iloenyosi (born 13 October 1980) is a Nigerian international footballer who played as a defender. He is presently the Founder of 042 Football Legends Association in Nigeria, a Charity Organization that help and support Ex-footballers, the families of late footballers and also mentorship program for Youths that has the Passion and live for football. (042 football Legends Association has successfully paid the hospital bill of so many footballers with health challenge and also currently sponsoring 45 Children of Ex-footballers in Secondary schools within the Country).
Chikelue Iloenyosi Popularly Called "D'GENERAL" is also the Senior Special Advicer to NNF President (Amaju Melvin Pinnick) and also Technical Advicer to NNL Chairman.
Chikelue Iloenyosi is presently married to his lovely and caring wife (Oluyemisi Ojo) they're blessed with 3 lovely Children (Stephanie, Amaka and Chico).
Chikelue Iloenyosi is indeed a pillar of hope to many and a source of encouragement to Nigerian Youths.

Career
Iloenyosi has played professionally for Nipost Football Club Enugu, Calabar Rovers, Udoji United, Enugu Rangers, El-kanemi warriors of Maiduguri, Iwuanyanwu Nationel F.C Owerri, Fenabache Spor Kulubu, Tennis Borussia Berlin, Çaykur Rizespor, Ittihad FC, Asteras Tripoli and Al-Ittihad Club.

Iloenyosi featured in the Nigeria national under-20 football team at the 1999 FIFA World Youth Championship. He earned fifteen (15) senior caps for Nigeria in 2000 and he was part of the Olympic team 2000 in Sydney.

In May 2011 he was banned by the Nigeria Football Federation (NFF) for participating in the rival Nigeria Football Association (NFA), because of his commitment to Improve football development in Nigeria. Both organizations later came to an agreement, After FIFA Sent a letter to clear Chikelue from the Banned list.

References

1978 births
Living people
Footballers from Enugu
Nigerian footballers
Nigeria international footballers
Nigeria under-20 international footballers
Nigerian expatriate footballers
Association football defenders
Tennis Borussia Berlin players
Çaykur Rizespor footballers
Asteras Tripolis F.C. players
Süper Lig players
Expatriate footballers in Germany
Expatriate footballers in Turkey
Expatriate footballers in Greece
Expatriate footballers in Saudi Arabia